The epithet "the Warlike" may refer to:

 Albert Alcibiades, Margrave of Brandenburg-Kulmbach (1522–1557)
 Crimthann the Warlike, 8th century Irish individual whose identity is uncertain - see Aedh Ailghin
 Frederick I, Elector of Saxony (1370–1428), also Margrave of Meissen
 Frederick II, Duke of Austria (1211–1246), Duke of Austria and of Styria
 Michael VI Bringas (died 1059), Byzantine emperor from 1056 to 1057

See also
 Aphrodite Areia ("Aphrodite the Warlike"), a cult epithet of the Greek goddess Aphrodite
 List of people known as the Peaceful

Lists of people by epithet